Demon hunter or demon slayer is a demonology-related historic occupation or folkloric character which specializes in demons, angels, monsters, or undead creatures. A demon hunter typically is involved with a deity and angels, and they typically wield religious text, holy water, and relics. It has diverse roots in myths, Abrahamic religions, African magic, Christian media, Classic Chinese Novels, and Japanese urban legend. Variants include other monster hunters, such as the dragonslayer and vampire hunter.

In history
A demon hunter was a specially prepared or instructed clergy, typically a priest, nun, monk, pastor, imam, rabbi, fangxiangshi, or kannushi. This occupation continues to exist, and is referred to as an exorcist.

In fiction
Some of the most popular fictional demon hunters characters are Buffy Summers, Dante, Doomguy, Guts, Illidan Stormrage, Nezuko Kamado, Tanjiro Kamado, Spawn, Dean Winchester, Sam Winchester. and Bayonetta.

References

 
Obsolete occupations